Gregor Fink (born 3 July 1984) is a Slovenian footballer who plays as a goalkeeper for Austrian team USV Wies.

References

External links
NZS profile 

1984 births
Living people
Sportspeople from Celje
Slovenian footballers
Association football goalkeepers
NK Celje players
NK Olimpija Ljubljana (2005) players
NK Drava Ptuj players
NK Rudar Velenje players
NK Zavrč players
Aris Limassol FC players
Slovenian Second League players
Slovenian PrvaLiga players
Cypriot Second Division players
Slovenian expatriate footballers
Slovenian expatriate sportspeople in Cyprus
Expatriate footballers in Cyprus
Slovenian expatriate sportspeople in Austria
Expatriate footballers in Austria
Slovenia youth international footballers
Slovenia under-21 international footballers